Undercover is a Philippine television drama broadcast on TV5. It aired from July 1 to August 30, 2013.

Cast
Derek Ramsay as Roy Velasco - Roy is a celebrated investigator who has sent notorious criminals to jail. But his seemingly perfect life ends when he is abducted on the day of his wedding to his long-time girlfriend, Julia. For 6 years, he was imprisoned and subject to psychological torture. Upon his release, he vows to search and punish the person behind his abduction.
Arci Muñoz as Julia Velasco - Roy's abduction devastates his fiancée, Julia, who takes comfort in Alex, Roy's adoptive brother.
Jasmine Curtis-Smith as Claire Ramirez - Claire is an IT whiz and gadgets expert who joins Roy's search for his abductors to punish the syndicate that killed her brother.
Wendell Ramos as Alex Velasco - Alex is Roy's kind and gentle adoptive brother, who ends up marrying Julia after Roy's abduction and presumed death.
Phillip Salvador as Don Faustino - Don Faustino is a smuggling lord put to jail by Roy. He retaliates by having Roy abducted and imprisoned for 10 years.
Joross Gamboa as Jimboy - Jimboy is a talented con artist that Roy approached to join his team because of his many connections in the criminal underworld.
Gerard Acao as Cotton - Cotton is Roy's loyal friend from the task force who joins Roy's mission to uncover the truth behind his abduction.
Ehra Madrigal-Yeung as Verna
Christian Samson as Carlo

Guest cast
BJ Go as Intoy
Lito Legaspi as Manolo
Sophie Albert as Katherine
Alice Dixson as Sandra

International Broadcast

See also
List of programs broadcast by 5 (TV channel)

References

External links

TV5 (Philippine TV network) drama series
Philippine drama television series
2013 Philippine television series debuts
2013 Philippine television series endings
Philippine action television series
Espionage television series
Filipino-language television shows